Auseklis Baušķenieks (1910–2007) was a Latvian painter.

References

1910 births
2007 deaths
People from Jelgava
People from Courland Governorate
20th-century Latvian painters
Pointillism